Cyanopepla phoenicia is a moth of the subfamily Arctiinae. It was described by George Hampson in 1898. It is found in Bolivia.

References

Cyanopepla
Moths described in 1898